The Marine Casualty Investigation Board (MCIB) is the Irish government agency for investigating maritime accidents and incidents. Its head office is in Dublin.

The agency, created as a result of the Merchant Shipping (Investigation of Marine Casualties) Act, 2000, was established on 5 June 2002.

References

External links

 Marine Casualty Investigation Board

Maritime safety organizations
Government agencies of the Republic of Ireland
2002 establishments in Ireland
Government agencies established in 2002